The Committee's Punch Bowl is a small tarn on the continental divide straddling the border between the Canadian provinces of Alberta and British Columbia. George Simpson, governor of the Hudson's Bay Company, named the lake for the London-based managing committee of that company in 1824. While journeying on an important trade route in the company's trade area in what is now western Canada and parts of Alaska and the northwestern United States, he saw the lake at the summit of Athabasca Pass.

As Simpson noted, Committee's Punch Bowl drains to two oceans.  Its northwest margin is the source of the Whirlpool River, tributary to the Athabasca River which runs to Lake Athabasca.  That lake drains into the Rivière des Rochers which in turn joins the Peace River to form the Slave River to Great Slave Lake from which the waters descend down the Mackenzie River to the Arctic Ocean.

The southern outlet drains to Pacific Creek to the Wood River to the former Canoe River, now impounded and called the Canoe Reach of Kinbasket Lake, a reservoir of the Columbia River, which runs to the Pacific Ocean in the United States.

See also 
 Divide Creek, a creek 167km southeast of Committee's Punch Bowl, which drains to both sides of the Continental Divide on the British Columbia-Alberta border; its easterly waters flow to the Arctic by way of Hudson's Bay

References

External links 
LanduseKN,  Dr. Peter Murphy - La Grande Traverse Part 5 (22 Sept. 2013). YouTube video series by a Professor Emeritus of Forestry with the Department of Renewable Resources, University of Alberta, on the route through Athabasca Pass. Image and description of Committee's Punch Bowl begins at 5:00. 
Martyupnorth,Solo Backpack trip up to Athabasca Pass, Jasper, Alberta (2 Sept. 2012). YouTube video, with footage of Committee's Punch Bowl beginning at 10:17.

Further reading 
 Edmonds, W. Everard, “Committee’s Punch Bowl”, The Beaver,  September 1949, p. 12.  Winnipeg:  Hudson’s Bay Company.

Lakes of Alberta
Lakes of British Columbia
Great Divide of North America